Melanne is a given name. Notable people with the name include:

Melanne Pennington (1960–1988), American competitive winner and beauty pageant contestant
Melanne Verveer (born 1944), American diplomat

See also
Melanie

Feminine given names